Samuel Whittlesey Dana (February 13, 1760July 21, 1830) was an American lawyer and politician from Middletown, Connecticut. He represented Connecticut in both the U.S. House of Representatives and Senate.

Biography 
Born in Wallingford in the Connecticut Colony, Dana matriculated Yale College in 1771 at age 11, and graduated in 1775 at age 15. He studied law; was admitted to the bar in 1778, and practiced in Middletown, Connecticut.

Family 
His father was the clergyman James Dana (1735–1812), who was a nephew of Richard Dana (1699–1772), a lawyer, who was in turn a descendant through Caleb, second son of Daniel, who was the youngest son of Richard Dana, who came from England, settled in Cambridge in 1640, and died there about 1695. According to the family tradition, this last Richard was the son of a French Huguenot that settled in England in 1629.

On July 13, 1821 Dana married Mary (or Maria) Pomeroy Alsop, the widow of the poet Richard Alsop (1761-1815). Maria was the daughter of Eleazer Wheelock Pomeroy (1739-1793) and Mary Wyllys (1742-1783). Her brother Samuel Wyllys Pomeroy was the founder of the town of Pomeroy Ohio, developed with the help of his son-in-law Valentine Baxter Horton (1802-1888), who married Clara Alsop Pomeroy, who was a niece-by-marriage of Mr. Dana. The bimetalist Samuel Dana Horton (1844-1895) was named after Mr. Dana, who was Valentine Baxter Horton's law tutor.Samuel Dana Horton

Career 
Dana was a member of the Connecticut General Assembly from 1789 to 1796. Afterward he was elected to the United States House of Representatives to fill the vacancy caused by the resignation of Uriah Tracy, and served from January 3, 1797 to May 10, 1810.  There he was chairman of the U.S. House Committee on Elections, and was one of the managers appointed by the House of Representatives in 1798 to conduct the impeachment proceedings against William Blount, a Senator from Tennessee.

Dana was elected as a Federalist in 1810 to the United States Senate to fill the vacancy caused by the resignation of James Hillhouse. He was reelected in 1814 and served from December 4, 1810, to March 3, 1821. He was one of the 13 Senators who voted against war with Britain on June 17, 1812, but 19 Senators voted for war.  In 1814, Dana was elected a member of the American Antiquarian Society.

Dana was mayor of Middletown from 1822 until his death in 1830. He was also the presiding judge of the Middlesex County Court from 1825 until his death.

Death 
Dana died in Middletown, Middlesex County, Connecticut, July 21, 1830 (age 70 years, 158 days). He is interred at Washington Street Cemetery, Middletown.

References

External links 

 American National Biography
 Dictionary of American Biography
 Dana, Samuel Whittlesey [presumed author]. A Specimen of Republican Institutions. Philadelphia: James Humphreys, 1802.
 
 
 

Govtrack US Congress

1760 births
1830 deaths
People from Wallingford, Connecticut
United States senators from Connecticut
Federalist Party United States senators
Mayors of Middletown, Connecticut
Yale College alumni
Federalist Party members of the United States House of Representatives from Connecticut
Members of the American Antiquarian Society
People of colonial Connecticut
American people of English descent